The 1943 Mississippi gubernatorial election took place on November 2, 1943 to elect the Governor of Mississippi. Incumbent Democrat Paul B. Johnson Sr. was term-limited, and could not run for reelection to a second term (he died less than two months after the election was held). As was common at the time, the Democratic candidate ran unopposed in the general election so therefore the Democratic primary was the real contest, and winning the primary was considered tantamount to election.

Democratic primary
No candidate received a majority in the Democratic primary, which featured 4 contenders, so a runoff was held between the top two candidates. The runoff election was won by former state representative Thomas L. Bailey, who defeated former Governor Martin S. Conner.

Results

Runoff

General election
In the general election, Bailey ran unopposed.

Results

References

1943
gubernatorial
Mississippi
November 1943 events